Vendomyces is a genus of purported Ediacaran fungi, assigned to the Chytridiomycetes.
However, it is unlikely that these fossils truly represent fungi.

See also
 List of Ediacaran genera

References

Prehistoric fungi
Prehistoric life genera